The BMW 7 Series is a full-size luxury sedan manufactured and marketed by the German automaker BMW since 1977. It is the successor to the BMW E3 "New Six" sedan and is now in its seventh generation.

The 7 Series is BMW's flagship car and is only available in a sedan bodystyle (including long wheelbase and limousine models). It traditionally introduces technologies and exterior design themes before other models in BMW's lineup.

The first generation of the 7 Series was powered by straight-6 petrol engines, and following generations have been powered by inline-4, straight-6, V8 and V12 engines with both natural aspiration and turbocharging. Since 1995, diesel engines have been optional in the 7 Series.

Unlike the 3 Series and 5 Series sedans, BMW has offered a nonpureblood M variant, the BMW M760 6.6L V12 (at the time the most powerful BMW ever made, not to be confused with BMW 760 6.6 V12 which does not offer the same performance). The Alpina B7 (G12) serves as one of the high-performance variants of the 7 Series.

First generation (E23; 1977) 

The E23 is the first generation 7 Series and was produced from 1977 to 1987. It was built in a 4-door sedan body style with 6-cylinder engines, to replace the E3 sedans. From 1983 to 1987, a turbocharged 6-cylinder engine was available.

The E23 introduced many electronic features for the first time in a BMW, including an onboard computer, a service interval indicator, a "check control panel" (warning lights to indicate system faults to the driver), a dictaphone, and complex climate control systems. It was also the first BMW to offer an anti-lock braking system (ABS), a driver's airbag, and double-link front suspension.

Second generation (E32; 1986) 

The E32 is the second generation of the 7 Series, which was produced from 1986 to 1994. It was initially available with a straight-six or V12 engine, the latter being Germany's first passenger car with a V12 since World War II. In 1992, V8 engines became available.

The E32 introduced the following features for the first time in a BMW: Electronic Damper Control, V12 and V8 engines, double glazing, the CAN bus electronic protocol, Xenon headlamps, traction control and dual-zone climate control. The 'iL' models were the first time that a long-wheelbase option was offered by BMW.

Third generation (E38; 1994) 

The E38 is the third generation of the 7 Series, which was produced from 1994 to 2001. The model range consisted of standard length and long wheelbase ("iL" models) sedans.

The petrol engines available consisted of straight-six, V8 and V12 engines. The E38 was the first 7 Series to be available with a diesel engine; initially, a turbocharged straight-six, which was joined by a twin-turbocharged V8 in 1999.

The E38 was the first car available with curtain airbags. It was also the first European car to offer satellite navigation and the first BMW to offer an in-built television.

Fourth generation (E65/E66/E67/E68; 2001) 

The E65/E66/E67/E68 is the fourth generation 7 Series, which was produced from 2001 to 2008. The model range consisted of standard length and long wheelbase ("Li" models) sedans.

The E65/E66/E67/E68 was the first BMW to include iDrive, "flame-surfacing" exterior styling, active anti-roll bars, a 6-speed automatic transmission, an electronic smart Key (dispensing with the traditional metallic key) and night vision. The 760i model was the world's first production V12 engine to use direct injection.

Fifth generation (F01/F02/F03/F04; 2008) 

The F01/F02/F03/F04 is the fifth-generation 7 Series, which was produced from 2008 to 2015. The model range consisted of standard length and long wheelbase ("Li" models) sedans.

The F01 was the first BMW to be available with a hybrid drivetrain ("ActiveHybrid 7"), 8-speed automatic transmission, and a turbocharged V12 engine. It was also the first 7 Series to be available with a turbocharged petrol engine and all-wheel drive (xDrive).

Sixth generation (G11/G12; 2015)

The G11/G12 is the sixth generation of the 7 Series, which has been in production since 2015. It was revealed on June 10, 2015, at BMW's headquarters in Munich. An official public reveal took place at the 2015 International Motor Show Germany.

G11 is the codename for the short-wheelbase model, the extended-wheelbase model is codenamed G12 and designated with an additional L letter.

The G11/G12 is the first car lineup of the BMW Group to be based on the modular OKL platform (Oberklasse, German for luxury class). The OKL platform adopts technology first introduced in BMW i models, namely the introduction of carbon-fiber-reinforced polymer as structural chassis components.

As part of BMW's strategy of introducing plug-in hybrid variants for all future car models, both, the short and long-wheelbase models will be available with hybrid powertrains under the designations 740e and 740Le in 2016.

A facelift model appeared in 2019 which prominently features a larger grille.

Seventh generation (G70; 2022) 

The BMW 7 Series debuted in April 2022. It has an electric variant, the BMW i7, along with 6-cylinder 740i and V8 760i models. It adopts horizontally split headlight units featured on the X7 LCI which was also launched in April 2022. Engine options remain similar with 3.0-litre 6-cylinder and 4.4-litre V8 options but no V12 engines will be offered.

BMW i7 

The BMW i7 is an electric variant to the BMW 7 Series, which was unveiled alongside it in April 2022.

Production and sales 

Sales of hybrid-powered 7 Series models in the United States are as follows:

References

External links 
 

7 Series
Flagship vehicles
Full-size vehicles